Doloessa hilaropis is a species of snout moth in the genus Doloessa. It was described by Edward Meyrick in 1897, and is known from New Guinea and Queensland in Australia.

References

Moths described in 1897
Tirathabini